Lorostema is a genus of ground beetles in the family Carabidae. There are about six described species in Lorostema.

Species
These six species belong to the genus Lorostema:
 Lorostema alutacea Motschulsky, 1865  (worldwide)
 Lorostema bothriophora (L.Redtenbacher, 1868)  (Australia, New Caledonia, Samoa, Tahiti, and Vanuatu)
 Lorostema informalis Darlington, 1952  (Indonesia and New Guinea)
 Lorostema interstitialis Jedlicka, 1935  (Philippines)
 Lorostema ogurae (Bates, 1883)  (Japan)
 Lorostema subnitens Andrewes, 1929  (Indonesia)

References

Platyninae